Lai In-jaw is a politician in the Republic of China. He was the former President of the Judicial Yuan as well as Chief Justice of the Constitutional Court of the Republic of China. He was the senior advisor to President Chen Shui-Bian for a short time before taking his position in Judicial Yuan.

Early life and education

Lai was born in Jiaoxi Township, Yilan County. He went to read law in the night school division of National Chung Hsing University (now National Taipei University) after graduating from Taiwan Provincial Ilan School of Agriculture and Forestry (now National Ilan University). After finishing his study in 1973, Lai proceeded to the National Taiwan University and completed a master's degree in law in 1976.

Lai then went to the United States to enroll in Harvard University. He studied under Louis Loss. He earned another master's degree and a doctoral degree in 1977 and 1981 respectively.

Career

Lai taught at the College of Law and Business, National Chung Hsing University (now National Taipei University) from 1981 to 1984. After that, he took up various government posts in the Ministry of Finance. In October 2000 during the first term of President Chen Shui-bian, he became the Vice Premier under Premier Chang Chun-hsiung. He was succeeded by Lin Hsin-i in February 2002.

Appointed by President Chen in 2007, Lai was promoted to the President of Judicial Yuan, after serving as a judge since 2003. He stepped down in July 2010 as a result of corruption scandal among four judges of Taiwan Higher Court. He turned down the offer of Senior Advisors to the Office of the President of the Republic of China in the same year.

Lai now serves as a lecture professor of National Chung Hsing University, National Taipei University and Chung Yuan Christian University.

External links

 The Honorable Justice Lai, In–Jaw Official Judicial Yuan bio

1946 births
Living people
Politicians of the Republic of China on Taiwan from Yilan County, Taiwan
Taiwanese Presidents of the Judicial Yuan
Senior Advisors to President Chen Shui-bian
Recipients of the Order of Brilliant Star
Recipients of the Order of Chiang Chung-Cheng
Harvard Law School alumni
National Taiwan University alumni
National Chung Hsing University alumni